Louise Monot (born 30 December 1981) is a French actress and model. Known as the face of the French cosmetics company Bourjois, she is also known for portraying one of the schoolgirls, Marine Lavor, on the television series, La vie devant nous. Monot also appeared in the film OSS 117: Lost in Rio.

She is a cast-member on the Amazon Studios science fiction drama series, The After.

Personal life
She has been in a relationship with French actor Samir Boitard since 2014. In October 2016, they announced they were expecting their first child via social networks.

Theater

Filmography

References

External links
 

1981 births
Living people
21st-century French actresses
Actresses from Paris
French film actresses